Richard Dallest (born 15 February 1951) is a French former racing driver.

Racing record

Complete European Formula Two Championship results
(key) (Races in bold indicate pole position; races in italics indicate fastest lap)

Complete International Formula 3000 results
(key) (Races in bold indicate pole position; races in italics indicate fastest lap.)

References

1951 births
Living people
French racing drivers
European Formula Two Championship drivers
FIA European Formula 3 Championship drivers
International Formula 3000 drivers
Place of birth missing (living people)